The 1917–18 Massachusetts Agricultural College Aggies men's ice hockey season was the 10th season of play for the program.

Roster

Standings

Schedule and Results

|-
!colspan=12 style=";" | Regular Season

References

UMass Minutemen ice hockey seasons
Massachusetts Agricultural College
Massachusetts Agricultural College
Massachusetts Agricultural College
Massachusetts Agricultural College